Ashot Chilingarian (born 18 May 1949) is an Armenian physicist known for his contributions to the fields of high-energy astrophysics, space weather, and high-energy atmospheric physics. He is the head of the Cosmic Ray Division (CRD) and the director of the Alikhanyan Physics Institute in Armenia.

Life and career 
Chilingarian was born on 18 May 1949, in Yerevan, Armenia into an academic family. His father, Aghasi Chilingarian, was a biologist and the head of the Institute of Zoology of the National Academy of Sciences of Armenia, mother Nora Nazarbekova graduated from Saint Petersburg Chemistry-Technological Institute. His elder sister, Marina Chilingarian graduated from the Armenian State Pedagogical University. 

He entered the Faculty of Physics of Yerevan State University in 1966, and in 1971 received his bachelor's degree in nuclear physics. He earned his PhD degree in 1984 and Doctorate of Science in Physics and Mathematics in 1991 from the Yerevan Physics Institute (YerPhi).

Awards 
During his professional life, Chilingarian has received many awards including:
Winner of the first ever World Summit on Information Society award in e-Science for the Data Visualization Interactive Network project in 2003
In 2008, Yerevan, Contribution to science by Armenia
Presidential Award in the field of physics for a series of research papers referred to as "High-energy phenomena in thunderous atmosphere" in 2012

Affiliations 
Chilingarian is a member of many professional societies such as:

 Armenia's representative to the International Commission for Space Research (COSPAR)
 Armenia's representative to the International Space Weather Initiative (ISWI)
 Armenia's representative to the European COST (European Cooperation in Science and Technology) action ES0803: "Developing space weather products and services in Europe"
 Founder and spokesperson of the Aragats Space Environmental Center (ASEC)
 Member of American Geophysical Union (AGU)
 Member of the international advisory committee of the European Cosmic Ray symposiums
 Member of the commission on cosmic rays of the Russian Academy of science
 Founder and spokesperson for the Space Environmental Viewing and Analysis Network (SEVAN)
 Fellow of the American Physical Society (APS)
 Associate editor of Space Weather & Space Climate (SWSC) journal

Publications (2007–2013) 
 A. Chilingarian, B. Mailyan and L. Vanyan, Recovering of the energy spectra of electrons and gamma rays coming from the thunderclouds, Atmospheric Research 114–115, 1–16, (2012).
 A. Chilingarian, N. Bostanjyan, and L. Vanyan, Neutron bursts associated with thunderstorms, Physical Review D 85, 085017 (2012).
 Chilingarian, A. and Mkrtchyan, H., Role of the Lower Positive Charge Region (LPCR) in initiation of the Thunderstorm Ground Enhancements (TGEs), Physical Review D 86, 072003 (2012).
 A. Chilingarian, N. Bostanjyan, T. Karapetyan, Remarks on recent results on neutron production during thunderstorms, Physical Review D 86, 093017 (2012).
 Chilingarian, A., G. Hovsepyan and A. Hovhannisyan, Particle bursts from thunderclouds: Natural particle accelerators above our heads, Phys. rev. D, 2011, 83, 062001.
 A. Chilingarian, A. Daryan, K. Arakelyan, et al., Ground-based observations of thunderstorm-correlated fluxes of high-energy electrons, gamma rays, and neutrons, Phys. Rev. D., 82, 043009, 2010
 A. Chilingarian and N. Bostanjyan, On the relation of the Forbush decreases detected by ASEC monitors during the 23rd solar activity cycle with ICME parameters, Advances in Space Research, Volume 45, Issue 5, 1 March 2010, Pages 614-621
 Chilingarian, A., and N. Bostanjyan, Cosmic Ray Intensity Increases Detected by Aragats Space Environmental Center Monitors during the 23rd Solar activity Cycle in Correlation with Geomagnetic Storms, J. Geophys. Res., 114, A09107, doi: 10.1029/2009JA014346, 2009.
 Chilingarian A., Statistical Study of the Detection of Solar Protons of Highest Energies at 20 January 2005. J. Adv. Space Res., 43, 702–707, 2009.
 M. Zazyan, A. Chilingarian, Calculations of the Sensitivity of the Particle Detectors of ASEC and SEVAN Networks to Galactic and Solar Cosmic Rays, Astropart. Phys. 32, 185–192, 2009, doi:10.1016/j.astropartphys.2009.08.001
 Chilingarian A., Hovsepyan G., Arakelyan K., et al., Space Environmental Viewing and Analysis Network (SEVAN). Earth, Moon, and Planets, v.104, p. 195, 2009.
 Chilingarian A. and Reymers A. Investigations of the Response of Hybrid Particle Detectors for the Space Environmental Viewing and Analysis Network (SEVAN). Ann. Geophys., 26, 249–257, 2008.
 Chilingarian, L. Melkumyan, G. Hovsepyan, A. Reymers, The Response Function of the Aragats Solar Neutron Telescope, Nuclear Instruments and Methods in Physics Research A 574 (2007) 255-263
 A. Chilingarian, G. Hovsepyan, et al., Study of Extensive Air Showers and Primary Energy Spectra by MAKET-ANI Detector on Mountain Aragats, Astroparticle Physics 28 (2007) 58-71
 N. Bostanjyan, N.K. et al., On the Production of Highest Energy Solar Prrotons at 20 January 2005, J. Adv. Space Res. 39 (2007) 1456–1459
 A. Chilingarian, A.E. Reymers, Particle Detectors in Solar Physics and Space Weather Research, Astroparticle Physics (2007), Astropart. Phys., 27, 465-472

References

External links 
CRD Yerphi
 http://www.yerphi.am/index.php/info-from-director

1949 births
Armenian physicists
Living people
Yerevan State University alumni
Scientists from Yerevan
Soviet physicists
20th-century physicists
21st-century physicists
Fellows of the American Physical Society